The Metropolitan Avenue/Lorimer Street station is an underground New York City Subway station complex shared by the BMT Canarsie Line and the IND Crosstown Line. Located in the Williamsburg neighborhood of Brooklyn, the complex is served by the G and L trains at all times.

The BMT Canarsie Line platforms, which are named Lorimer Street, are located above the IND Crosstown Line platforms, which are named Metropolitan Avenue. The Canarsie Line station opened in 1924, and the Crosstown Line station opened in 1937. Free transfers between the stations started in 1948.

Station layout

The L-shaped passageway, located above the Crosstown Line at its northern end and below the Canarsie Line at its western end, also serves as the mezzanine for the Crosstown Line lower level. When viewed from the Crosstown Line mezzanine, the passageway splits up as the right half leads to a ramp for Canarsie-bound trains while the left half leads to a crossunder to Eighth Avenue-bound trains.

Originally, passengers who wished to transfer between the Canarsie and Crosstown lines had to pay a separate fare, because the Brooklyn–Manhattan Transit Corporation (operator of the Canarsie Line) and the Independent Subway System (the Crosstown Line's operator) were competing companies. On July 1, 1948, eight years after the three operators of New York's subways were unified into a single entity, the transfer passageway was reconfigured to be inside fare control, thus permitting free transfers between lines.

In 2019, the MTA announced that this station would become ADA-accessible as part of the agency's 2020–2024 Capital Program. A contract for five elevators at the station (three at Lorimer Street and two at Metropolitan Avenue) was awarded in December 2020.

The 2000 artwork in the transfer passageway and the Crosstown Line mezzanine is called Signs of Life by Jackie Chang. A precinct of the New York City Transit Police is also located on the Crosstown Line mezzanine.

Exits
The main entrances at the corner of Metropolitan and Union Avenues lead to the transfer corridor between the lines. The high entry-exit turnstiles in the transfer corridor would be replaced with waist-high "low turnstiles" to accommodate increased passenger flow.

Each platform has a second set of entrances. The BMT platforms have a second set to the eastern corners of Lorimer Street and Metropolitan Avenue at their east ends. The IND platforms have one stair leading to the northwestern corner of Union Avenue and Hope Street and another leading to the northeastern corner of Union Avenue and Powers Street. The exits to Powers and Hope Streets were previously closed in 2000 due to safety concerns, blocked by metal street grates, and used as emergency exits. They were reopened on February 28, 2019 to accommodate the increased volume of passengers transferring between the Crosstown and Canarsie Line stations due to the 14th Street Tunnel shutdown. Originally, only one of these exits was planned to be reopened.

Despite the IND station's name on tiling, there is no longer an open exit to Grand Street. A passage beyond the Hope and Powers Streets exits leads to two more exits that led to both northern corners of Grand Street and Union Avenue. While the exit to the northeastern corner is also blocked by a metal sheet grate, the exit to the northwestern corner has been sealed and is inaccessible from street level. The exits to Grand Street were open until the section of the mezzanine that had the exits to Hope Street and Powers Street was closed; this is corroborated by photos of this portion of the mezzanine during its closure, which had signage directing to Grand Street intact, as well as MTA documents outlining the closure of the whole area.

The BMT station also has two closed exits; they led to the western corners of Lorimer Street and Metropolitan Avenue. They were also closed in 2000 and are also currently used as emergency exits.

The transfer mezzanine also features one closed staircase to the southeastern corner of Metropolitan Avenue and Union Avenue. The staircase was also closed in 2000, but has been completely sealed.

BMT Canarsie Line platforms 

The Lorimer Street station (announced as Metropolitan Avenue-Lorimer Street station)  on the BMT Canarsie Line has two tracks and two side platforms. It opened on June 30, 1924, as part of the initial segment of the underground Canarsie Line, a product of the Dual Contracts, stretching from Sixth Avenue in Manhattan to Montrose Avenue.

The Lorimer Street entry point has a mezzanine above the station. There is also another entrance at Union Avenue that leads directly to the Manhattan-bound platform. The transfer to the Crosstown Line is toward the Union Avenue (western; railroad northern) end of the station, where passageways descend from each platform to the Union Avenue mezzanine.

Image gallery

IND Crosstown Line platforms 

The Metropolitan Avenue station (announced as Metropolitan Avenue-Lorimer Street station) on the IND Crosstown Line opened on July 1, 1937 as part of the extension of the Crosstown Line from Nassau Avenue to Hoyt-Schermerhorn Streets. The station also has two tracks and two side platforms. Station tile signage retains the original name of the station: Metropolitan Avenue–Grand Street. Directional tile captions mimicking the style of original IND captions indicate "To Street and Transfer;" the tile captions replaced original captions pointing to Metropolitan Avenue at the north end and Grand Street at the south end. Two staircases from the north end of either platform lead to the mezzanine and transfer passageway to the BMT Canarsie Line.

The mezzanine is full-length, but has been reduced in size. A central portion was closed in the late 1990s and is now occupied by a police facility, employee space, and offices. The south portion was also previously closed and used as storage space, but was reopened on February 28, 2019 in preparation for the 14th Street Tunnel shutdown in April 2019. A previously removed staircase between the southbound platform and the mezzanine was also built.

Image gallery

References

External links 

 
 
 Station Reporter — Metropolitan Avenue/Lorimer Street Complex
 The Subway Nut — Lorimer Street Pictures
 The Subway Nut — Metropolitan Avenue–Grand Street Pictures
 MTA's Arts For Transit — Metropolitan Avenue/Lorimer Street

Google Maps Street View:

 Union Avenue, Keap Street, and Metropolitan Avenue entrances
 Metropolitan Avenue entrance
 Lorimer Street entrances
 BMT platforms
 IND platforms

BMT Canarsie Line stations
IND Crosstown Line stations
New York City Subway stations in Brooklyn
Railway stations in the United States opened in 1924
Railway stations in the United States opened in 1937
1937 establishments in New York City
New York City Subway transfer stations
Williamsburg, Brooklyn